Gereb Mihiz is a reservoir located in the Hintalo Wajirat woreda of the Tigray Region in Ethiopia. The earthen dam that holds the reservoir was built in 1998 by SAERT.

Dam characteristics 
 Dam height: 17.5 metres
 Dam crest length: 403 metres
 Spillway width: 15 metres

Capacity 
 Original capacity: 1300000 m³
 Dead storage: 325000 m³
 Reservoir area: 30 ha
In 2002, the life expectancy of the reservoir (the duration before it is filled with sediment) was estimated at 21 years.

Irrigation 
 Designed irrigated area: 80 ha
 Actual irrigated area in 2002: 38 ha

Environment 
The catchment of the reservoir is 17.16 km² large, with a perimeter of 20.38 km and a length of 4910 metres. The reservoir suffers from rapid siltation. The lithology of the catchment is Mekelle Dolerite and Agula Shale. Part of the water that could be used for irrigation is lost through seepage; the positive side-effect is that this contributes to groundwater recharge.

References 

Reservoirs in Ethiopia
Tigray Region
Agriculture in Ethiopia
Water in Ethiopia
Establishments in Ethiopia